Ernest Delmor "Del" Thachuk (born c. 1936 - October 28, 2018) was a Canadian football player who played for the Edmonton Eskimos.

References

1930s births
2018 deaths
Canadian football guards
Edmonton Elks players